The Sandpoint Historic District in Sandpoint, Idaho is a historic district which was listed on the National Register of Historic Places in 1984, and enlarged in 2018.  When first listed, it consisted of 13 buildings on the block bound by 1st and 2nd Avenues, Main St., and Cedar St., plus two other buildings across from the block.

It includes:
W.A. Bernd Building (1907), 307-311 N. First Avenue, which was separately listed on the National Register in 1983.
Sandpoint City Hall (1910), Second and Main 
Knights of Pythias Hall (1909), 202 Main Street, later the Sandpoint Sewing and Vacuum Center
B.P.O.E. Lodge #1376 (1936), 314 N. Second Avenue
Panida Theater(1927), 300 N. First Avenue

References

External links

National Register of Historic Places in Bonner County, Idaho
Art Deco architecture in Idaho
Buildings and structures completed in 1904
Bonner County, Idaho
Historic districts in Idaho